Alisa Kleybanova and Sania Mirza were the defending champions, but Mirza did not compete in the Juniors this year. Kleybanova competed with Irina Kotkina but they lost in the quarterfinals to Marina Erakovic and Monica Niculescu.

Victoria Azarenka and Olga Govortsova defeated Erakovic and Niculescu in the final, 6–4, 3–6, 6–4 to win the girls' doubles tennis title at the 2004 Wimbledon Championships.

Seeds

  Michaëlla Krajicek /  Shahar Pe'er (semifinals)
  Veronika Chvojková /  Nicole Vaidišová (semifinals)
  Victoria Azarenka /  Olga Govortsova (champions)
  Marina Erakovic /  Monica Niculescu (final)
  Kateryna Bondarenko /  Mădălina Gojnea (second round)
  Chan Yung-jan /  Aleksandra Wozniak (quarterfinals)
  Alisa Kleybanova /  Irina Kotkina (quarterfinals)
  Hsu Wen-hsin /  Sun Shengnan (first round)

Draw

Finals

Top half

Bottom half

References

External links

Girls' Doubles
Wimbledon Championship by year – Girls' doubles